Mentor was launched in Philadelphia in 1758 under another name. For some time her name was British King. By the time she first appeared in Lloyd's Register (LR) in 1776 her name had become Mentor. From 1776 to 1790 she was a whaler in the Greenland whale fishery, though she also spent time trading generally, and as a transport. In 1791 she commenced a voyage to the southern whale fishery but received damage en route and was condemned at the River Plate.

Career
Mentor first appeared in Lloyd's Register (LR) in 1776.

Captain William Ramsey sailed on 22 July 1791, bound for the Southern Whale Fishery.

Fate
Mentor was reported to have put into Buenos Aires or Montevideo on 20 December. She had sustained much damage and it was expected that she would be condemned.

LR continued to carry Mentor for some years thereafter, but with data unchanged since 1791. However, there is no subsequent mention in Lloyd's List ship arrival and departure data for 1791 to 1794 of a Mentor arriving back in Great Britain from the River Plate region.

Citations

References
 

1758 ships
Ships built in Philadelphia
Age of Sail merchant ships of England
Whaling ships